Kathleen Gonzalez-Schuurmans (born 3 July 1966) is a Belgian former professional tennis player.

Active on the professional tour in the 1980s, Schuurmans had a career high singles ranking of 326 in the world and featured in qualifying draws at the French Open. She represented the Belgium Federation Cup team in 1984 and 1985, appearing in a total of six ties. In 1984, she put Belgium into the second round of the World Group when she teamed up with Nicole Mabille to win the deciding doubles tie against Colombia.

Schuurmans married Mexican Davis Cup player Alfonso González and lives in Mechelen, where she works as a pharmacists's assistant. She is also heavily involved in Belgian basketball, serving as team manager of women's division one team BC Castors Braine. Previously she was team manager for the men's and women's national teams.

ITF finals

Doubles: 3 (1–2)

References

External links
 
 
 

1966 births
Living people
Belgian female tennis players
Belgian basketball coaches
Sportspeople from Antwerp Province
20th-century Belgian women